A fortified tower (also defensive tower or castle tower or, in context, just tower) is one of the defensive structures used in fortifications, such as castles, along with curtain walls. Castle towers can have a variety of different shapes and fulfil different functions.

Shape of towers

Rectangular towers

Square or rectangular towers are easy to construct and give a good amount of usable internal space. Their disadvantage is that the corners are vulnerable to mining. Despite this vulnerability, rectangular towers continued to be used, and Muslim military architecture generally favoured them.

Round towers

Round towers, also called drum towers, are more resistant to siege technology such as sappers and projectiles than square towers. The round front is more resistant than the straight side of a square tower, just as a load-bearing arch. This principle was already understood in antiquity.

Horseshoe-shaped towers

The horseshoe-shaped (or D-shaped) tower is a compromise that gives the best of a round and a square tower. The semicircular side (the one facing the attacker) could resist siege engines, while the rectangular part at the back gives internal space and a large fighting platform on top. The large towers at Krak des Chevaliers and the gate towers at Harlech are good examples. Armenian castles such as Lampron also favoured this style.

Polygonal towers

A common form is an octagonal tower, used in some bergfrieds and at Castel del Monte in Italy.

There are also hybrid shapes. For instance, the keep at Château Gaillard is slightly bent forward, but also has a triangular beak to deflect projectiles.

Towers with specific functions

Wall towers, also known as mural towers, provide flanking fire (from crossbows or other projectile weapons) to a straight part of the curtain wall. Corner towers enfilade the two adjoining wall faces. If corner towers are far apart, additional flanking towers may be added between them. Towers in an outer curtain wall are often open at the back.

Particularly large towers are often the strongest point of the castle: the
keep or the bergfried. As the gate is always a vulnerable point of a castle, towers may be built near it to strengthen the defences at this point. In crusader castles, there is often a gate tower, with the gate passage leading through the base of the tower itself. In European castles, it is more common to have flanking towers on either side of the gatehouse.

See also

Flanking tower
 Gate tower
Half tower
Martello tower
 Scottish Broch
 Tower house
 Witch tower
 Shell keep

References

Sources 
 
 

Castle architecture